Blink of an Eye is the sixth studio album by the American progressive rock band Enchant. It was released in July 2002.

Track listing 
 "Under Fire" (Leonard, Ott) – 5:58
 "Monday" (Leonard, Ott) – 7:10
 "Seeds Of Hate" (Leonard, Ott) – 6:17
 "Flat Line" (Ott) – 5:23
 "Follow The Sun" (Ott) – 6:08
 "Ultimate Gift" (Ott) – 7:58
 "My Everafter" (Leonard, Ott) – 5:39
 "Invisible" (Leonard, Ott) – 5:41
 "Despicable" (Leonard, Ott) – 4:13
 "Prognosis" (Bonus Track) (Ott) – 7:29

Personnel 
 Phil Bennett – Keyboard solos and additional keyboards on 'Seeds Of Hate', 'My Everafter' and 'Prognosis'
 Ted Leonard – vocals and additional guitar on 'Despicable'
 Douglas A. Ott – guitar, keyboards and bass on 'Follow The Sun'
 Ed Platt – bass guitar
 Sean Flanegan – drums

References 

 https://www.seaoftranquility.org/reviews.php?op=showcontent&id=320

Enchant (band) albums
2002 albums
Inside Out Music albums